Major General Thomas Brodie, CB, CBE, DSO (20 November 1903 – 1 September 1993) was a British Army officer who saw service in World War II, Palestine and the Korean War. After retirement in 1955, he became involved with the British pressure group, the Economic League.

Military career
Thomas Brodie was born on 20 November 1903 in Bellingham, Northumberland, to Thomas Brodie. He attended Durham University (Bede College), gaining a Bachelor of Arts degree in 1924. In 1938, Brodie married Jane Margaret Chapman Walker. The couple had three sons and a daughter.

Brodie was commissioned as a second lieutenant into the Cheshire Regiment on 3 February 1926. In May 1936, recently promoted to Captain, he was appointed as the Cheshire's Regimental Adjutant. From September 1939, he served as an instructor at the Royal Military College, Sandhurst.

He was promoted to Major in April 1941 and between 1942 and 1943 as an acting Lieutenant Colonel, Brodie commanded the 2nd Battalion, The Manchester Regiment. From November 1943 until March 1945, he commanded the 14th Infantry Brigade in India and Burma (subsequently redesignated in November 1944 as the 14th Airlanding Brigade). In this period, his substantive rank remained as major, but he received acting and temporary ranks of Lt Colonel, Colonel and Brigadier.

After the War, Brodie returned to the Cheshires and between 1946 and 1947 he was Commanding Officer of the 1st Battalion. In May 1947, he was formally promoted to Lt. Colonel and, within a few days, to Colonel. Between 1947 and 1948, he served in Palestine, being appointed CBE and mentioned in despatches.

As a "local" Major-General (he received the substantive rank of Brigadier in October 1952), Brodie commanded the 29th Infantry Brigade in Korea. He participated in the difficult Third Battle of Seoul and the Battle of the Imjin River, defending the northern approach of Seoul in both battles. For his service in Korea, he received the DSO and the US Silver Star (twice) and the Legion of Merit.

Between 1952 and July 1955, Brodie was General Officer Commanding, 1st Infantry Division, based in the Middle East. He retired from the Army on 1 January 1957.

Brody was appointed as Honorary Colonel of the Cheshire Regiment (a ceremonial role) on 26 December 1955 and served until December 1961. He was associated with the British right-wing pressure group, the Economic League, from 1957 until 1984.

Thomas Brodie died at Basingstoke, Hampshire on 1 September 1993. His wife, Margaret, had died the previous year.

Honours and awards
Companion of the Order of the Bath – 1 January 1954
Commander of the Order of the British Empire – 7 January 1949
Distinguished Service Order – 7 September 1951
Mention in Despatches – 26 April 1945
Silver Star (United States) – 8 June 1951 and 10 August 1954
Officer of the Legion of Merit (United States) – 30 October 1953

References

External links
British Army Officers 1939–1945
Generals of World War II

|-

1903 births
1993 deaths
People from Bellingham, Northumberland
Cheshire Regiment officers
Companions of the Order of the Bath
Commanders of the Order of the British Empire
Companions of the Distinguished Service Order
Recipients of the Silver Star
Officers of the Legion of Merit
British Army personnel of the Korean War
British military personnel of the Palestine Emergency
Alumni of the College of the Venerable Bede, Durham
British Army brigadiers of World War II
British Army major generals
Academics of the Royal Military College, Sandhurst
Graduates of the Staff College, Camberley
Alumni of Durham University
Military personnel from Northumberland